This is a list of diplomatic missions in Eswatini (formerly known as Swaziland). At present, the capital city of Mbabane hosts seven embassies/high commissions.

The Eswati government does not publish a diplomatic list online, so the information on this page has been gathered from various other sources, including foreign ministries online.  As such, this listing is incomplete pending official information.

Embassies/High Commissions in Mbabane

Other missions or delegations in Mbabane
 (Liaison office)

Gallery

Non-resident embassies/high commissions
Resident in Pretoria unless otherwise noted

Other posts
 (Delegation)

See also
 Foreign relations of Eswatini

References

External links
Government of Eswatini

Foreign relations of Eswatini
Eswatini
Diplomatic missions